That's Christmas to Me is the third studio album by a cappella group Pentatonix. It is their sixth release overall and their second holiday release following their 2012 EP PTXmas. It only features previously unreleased material (except "Let It Go", a bonus track of the Japanese Edition of Vols. 1 & 2). It was released on October 21, 2014 through RCA Records, peaked at number 2 on the Billboard 200, and has been certified double platinum by the Recording Industry Association of America.

The album is named after the eponymous song by Pentatonix, the only original song featured on the album. By year's end, December 31, 2014, according to Billboard, it reached a final 2014 total of 1.14 million copies sold, becoming the 4th best selling album of 2014 by any artist of any genre. The album is also the highest charting holiday album by a group since 1962. The album has sold 2,200,000 copies in the United States as of December 2016.

Commercial performance 
That's Christmas to Me peaked at number two on the Billboard 200 in the United States. and at number 4 on the Billboard Canadian Albums Chart. The album also charted moderately in other countries including Australia, New Zealand and Norway. On December 1, 2014, That's Christmas to Me was certified gold by the Recording Industry Association of America and became the group's first accredited release in the US. By year's end (December 31, 2014), Billboard reported that the album had sold a total of 1.14 million copies, becoming only the 4th album to sell a million copies in 2014 in any genre (being surpassed only by Taylor Swift's 1989, the Frozen soundtrack, and Sam Smith's In the Lonely Hour) and was the Top Selling Holiday Album for 2014.
 Pentatonix became the first act to top both the Holiday Albums and Holiday Songs charts simultaneously since the Holiday 100 launched as a multi-metric tabulation in December 2011. The album is also the highest charting holiday album by a group since 1962.  The album has sold 1,900,000 copies in the US as of December 2016. It is the only Christmas album to appear on the 2010s decade-end chart for the Billboard 200, charted at 75.

A single from the album, the group's cover of "Mary, Did You Know?", both debuted and peaked on the Billboard Hot 100 at number 26, number 7 on the Adult Contemporary chart, and at number 44 on the Canadian Hot 100. The album's title track, "That's Christmas to Me", also peaked at number 8 on the Adult Contemporary chart. During the holiday season, seven songs from That's Christmas to Me charted on the Billboard Holiday Digital Songs chart: "Mary, Did You Know?" at number 1, "White Winter Hymnal" at number 2, "Silent Night" at number 5, "Dance of the Sugar Plum Fairy" at number 8, "Sleigh Ride" at number 12, "That's Christmas to Me" at number 16 and "Hark! The Herald Angels Sing" at number 17.

Critical reception 
The album received generally favorable reviews by critics. Popdust complimented its "blistery bold arrangements," and the group's "truly remarkable, pinpoint precision." Markos Papadatos from Digital Journal described it as "pure joy and one of the best projects I've heard this year." FDRMX gave it 4.5 out of 5 stars, claiming the album has "a good mix of traditional holiday songs, religious ballads and originals thrown in." The Milwaukee Journal Sentinel dubbed it a "Christmas miracle," citing a "streak of beautifully sung, creative arrangements."

Promotion
In November 2014, Pentatonix were invited by Australian film director, producer and screenwriter Baz Luhrmann to be involved with the Holiday Window display at Barneys in New York City. Pentatonix performed at the opening night with a medley of songs from That's Christmas to Me.

On November 27, 2014, Pentatonix participated in the annual Macy's Thanksgiving Day Parade in New York City, performing "Santa Claus Is Coming to Town" on the Homewood Suites float. Pentatonix also performed during NBC's annual Christmas in Rockefeller Center special on December 3, 2014, performing "Sleigh Ride" and "Santa Claus Is Coming to Town".

Pentatonix returned to The Sing-Off, performing a medley of songs from That's Christmas to Me during the Season 5 holiday special, which aired on December 17, 2014.

Track listing 
All songs arranged by Pentatonix and Ben Bram.

Personnel 
 Scott Hoying – producer, baritone lead and backing vocals, co- vocal bass, and bass backing vocals on "It's The Most Wonderful Time Of The Year"
 Mitch Grassi – producer,  tenor  lead and backing vocals
 Kirstin Maldonado – producer, alto lead and backing vocals
 Avi Kaplan – producer, vocal bass, bass lead and backing vocals
 Kevin Olusola – producer, vocal percussion and backing vocals, lead vocals on "Mary Did You Know?" and "The First Noel"

Additional personnel
Ben Bram – producer
 Tori Kelly – lead vocals in "Winter Wonderland" / "Don't Worry Be Happy"
 Andrew Kesler – string producer on "Mary, Did You Know" (featuring The String Mob)
 Ed Boyer – mixing
Bill Hare – mastering

Charts

Weekly charts

Year-end charts

Decade-end charts

Certifications

See also 
 List of Billboard Top Holiday Albums number ones of the 2010s

References 

2014 Christmas albums
A cappella Christmas albums
Christmas albums by American artists
Pentatonix albums
RCA Records Christmas albums